Roberto Gómez Bolaños (21 February 1929 – 28 November 2014), more commonly known by his stage name Chespirito, or "Little Shakespeare", was a Mexican actor, comedian, screenwriter, humorist, director, producer, and author. He is widely regarded as one of the icons of Spanish-speaking humor and entertainment and one of the greatest comedians of all time. He is also one of the most loved and respected comedians in Latin America. He is mostly known by his acting role Chavo from the sitcom El Chavo del 8.

He is recognized all over the planet for writing, directing, and starring in the Chespirito (1970–1973, 1980–1995), El Chavo del Ocho (1973–1980), and El Chapulín Colorado (1973–1979) television series. The character of El Chavo is one of the most iconic in the history of Latin American television, and El Chavo del Ocho continues to be immensely popular, with daily worldwide viewership averaging 91 million viewers.

Early life
Roberto Gómez Bolaños was born in Mexico City on 21 February 1929. He was the second child of Francisco Gómez Linares, a painter and illustrator, who died at the age of 41 in 1935. His mother, Elsa Bolaños Aguilar, was a bilingual secretary; she died  of pancreatic cancer at the age of 66 in 1968. Elsa was the youngest child of Ramón Bolaños Cacho, a military doctor, and his Zacatecas-born wife, María Aguilar. Via his mother, Bolaños was a first cousin once removed of the President of Mexico from 1964 to 1970, Gustavo Díaz Ordaz. He had an older brother called Francisco (1926–2010), and a younger brother called Horacio Gómez Bolaños, who portrayed the character Godínez in El Chavo del Ocho, and an even older half-brother born of one of his father's liaisons.

Before becoming an actor, Gómez was an amateur boxer. He studied mechanical engineering at the National Autonomous University of Mexico (UNAM), but he never came to practice that profession. Before he became famous, he wrote a number of plays, contributed dialogue to Mexican film and television scripts, and secured some character-acting work. "Chespirito" was of short stature; his stage name was the Spanish phonetic pronunciation of William Shakespeare "Chespir" (pronounced "shespir") with diminutive suffix -"ito". Between 1960 and 1965 he dedicated himself to writing scripts for "Comedians and songs" and "El estudio de Pedro Vargas", which were the two programs with the highest audience in Mexico.

Career

Chespirito was discovered as an actor while waiting in line to apply for a job as a writer; soon he began writing and starring in his children's comedy shows. Chespirito's first show was Los Supergenios de la Mesa Cuadrada, a sketch comedy show that premiered in 1968; the show also starred Ramón Valdés, María Antonieta de las Nieves, and Rubén Aguirre. Los Supergenios was later renamed Chespirito y la Mesa Cuadrada and later Chespirito. The characters El Chavo, El Chapulín Colorado, and Dr. Chapatín were introduced on this show (1972, 1970 and 1968 respectively).

El Chavo del Ocho and El Chapulín Colorado

His best known roles were in the shows El Chavo del Ocho and El Chapulín Colorado. Both series premiered in 1973 and were based on sketches of the same name from Los Supergenios. The shows were produced by Mexican TV network Televisa and aired in 124 countries. Other shows produced by and starring Chespirito were the short-lived La Chicharra from 1979 and a second version of Chespirito from 1980 to 1995.

In El Chavo, Chespirito played an 8-year-old boy who often took refuge inside a wooden rain barrel in a Mexican neighborhood, and in El Chapulín Colorado he played a good-hearted superhero who gets involved in humorous situations. The Simpsons creator Matt Groening has said that he created the Bumblebee Man character after watching El Chapulín Colorado in a motel on the United States–Mexico border.

El Chavo and El Chapulín Colorado have become cultural icons all over Latin America and have aired in many countries worldwide.

Roberto Gomez Bolanos was also noted as a composer. He started writing music as a hobby, and most of his early musical work was related to his comedy work, featured particularly in occasional Chapulín Colorado or Chavo del Ocho special episodes. Later works include the theme songs for various Mexican movies and telenovelas, such as Alguna Vez Tendremos Alas and La Dueña. He is also the creator of the theater comedy Once y Doce (Eleven and Twelve), the most successful theater comedy in Mexican history; it is still played occasionally.

Works by Chespirito

Los Supergenios de la Mesa Cuadrada (1968–1973), renamed Chespirito y la Mesa Cuadrada in 1970 and Chespirito in 1971.
El Ciudadano Gómez (1968–1969; 1973; 1994–1995), a parody of Citizen Kane.

Dr. Chapatín (1968–1979; 1980–1995), one of the presenters of Los Supergenios who starred in sketches in the show, also appeared in the El Chapulín Colorado half-hour show of 1973–1979. He represents an old doctor who constantly has fights and confusions due to his old age and hitting people with a paper bag whose contents were never revealed in-sketch. In an interview, Chespirito revealed that Dr. Chapatín carried in his bag all the bad feelings of the people, which is why it hurt a lot. Dr. Chapatín's character did a small cameo in the movies "El Chanfle", "El Chanfle 2","Don Ratón y Don Ratero", and "El Charrito".
Chespirito (character) (1968–1975; 1980–1986; 1991–1992; 1994–1995), occasionally starred in sketches of the Los Supergenios as a "character".
El Chapulín Colorado (1970–1973; 1973–1979; 1980–1993), second most successful character of Bolaños; became a weekly half-hour show in 1973. A naive but brave superhero who always tries to help people in problems. 
Los Chifladitos (1970–1972; 1980–1995), starred alongside Rubén Aguirre, one of the main sketches of the Los Supergenios until Aguirre left the show. Chespirito did Chaparron Bonaparte and Aguirre, Lucas Tañeda, as a pair of demented characters who ran in several confusions by the use of puns and the unexpected convulsions of Chaparron called "Chiripiorcas".
Los Caquitos (1970–1975; 1980–1995) became the third most successful creation of Bolaños; sketches were created until 1975. Originally they were Chespirito as Chómpiras and Ramón Valdés as Peterete. In the sketches of the 80s, Edgar Vivar took the place of Valdés, playing a new character named El Botija, while Florinda Meza got a new character for the sketches as La Chimoltrufia, Botija's wife. It became Chespirito's main act in the last years of his program due to him being too old to perform his other characters.
Los Chiripiojos (1972), is the family La Chimoltrufia.
El Chavo del Ocho (1971–1973; 1973–1980; 1980–1992), created as immediate successor of Los Chifladitos; become a weekly half-hour show in 1973. Is about a poor kid who lives in a small neighborhood with other families who share comic situations. It's Chespirito's most successful character.
La Chicharra (1979–1982), half-hour show that replaced El Chapulín Colorado in 1979. He tried to create something new with a newspaper reporter who happens to take the wrong news in the wrong place. The show's lead character, Vicente Chambon, originally appeared as part of Chespirito in its early days.
Don Calavera (1994–1995), the nickname of Carlos Vera, a mortician who likes to flirt with widows, is the last character created by Chespirito, appears only in the 1980–1995 version of the Chespirito show.

Later years
On 19 November 2004, after 27 years together, he married actress and longtime companion Florinda Meza, who starred as Doña Florinda in El Chavo. After show production was stopped for El Chavo and El Chapulín Colorado, both toured Mexico and the rest of Latin America and the United States with different plays, sometimes playing the characters who made them famous. In 2003, Chespirito and Florinda Meza received the keys to the town of Cicero, Illinois.

During Mexico's presidential campaigns of 2000 and 2006 he openly supported the National Action Party (PAN) by appearing in TV commercials and urging people to vote for the party's candidates, Vicente Fox and Felipe Calderón. For the 2012 race, he made public that he would vote for the Partido Accion Nacional (PAN) candidate, Josefina Vázquez Mota, but did not appear in a commercial. In 2007, he joined a campaign led by Catholics and conservatives against the legalization of abortion in Mexico City.

He shared that while pregnant with him, his mother suffered an accident and the doctor advised her to get an abortion; she refused. He also wrote the books El Diario de El Chavo del Ocho ("Diary From the Kid from Number 8"), ...Y También Poemas ("...And Poems Too"), and Sin Querer Queriendo: Memorias ("Accidentally on Purpose: Memoirs"). In 2009, he was also honored by the Colombian TV-channel RCN in which he received the keys of the municipality of Soacha; more than 20,000 people attended the homage. On 12 November 2009, he was admitted to a Mexico City hospital due to prostate complications, which required a simple surgery to treat. He was released from treatment the following day.

On 29 February 2012, a celebration of Chespirito's life and work was held at the Auditorio Nacional. The special, titled América celebra a Chespirito, was a multinational tribute that gathered a diverse group of actors, singers, and fans from 17 nations. They included Armando Manzanero, Thalía, Ximena Navarrete, Marco Antonio Regil, Juan Gabriel, Diego Verdaguer, Gian Marco, Pandora, Reik, and OV7. Chespirito's ill health was apparent: he was in a wheelchair, required oxygen tanks, and could not stay the entire program. Nonetheless, he expressed great emotion and gratitude for the tribute. The special was broadcast across the participating nations on 11 March.

Over Twitter, Chespirito denounced the actions of the Yo Soy 132 movement after the takeover of Televisa Chapultepec following the 2012 election. In 2012, Chespirito was honored by his friends and former cast members, putting an end to many rumors that the comedian was dying. Even so, former colleagues such as Edgar Vivar expressed their concern publicly for Chespirito's poor health.

Death
At 2:30 PM (19:30 GMT) on Friday, 28 November 2014, Chespirito died from heart failure as a complication of Parkinson's disease at the age of 85, in his home in Cancún, Quintana Roo, Mexico. Many Mexican celebrities and Chespirito's former co-stars took to Twitter to express their feelings and send their condolences to Chespirito's widow and family. Such celebrities and former co-stars included George Lopez, Eugenio Derbez, Carlos Villagran, Edgar Vivar, Ruben Aguirre, and María Antonieta de las Nieves. Chespirito is widely regarded as one of the most renowned Spanish-language comedians of the 20th century.

On 1 December 2014, he was buried at the Panteón Francés in Mexico City, following a private funeral on Saturday and a public one held on Sunday at Estadio Azteca, attended by about 40,000 fans. His widow does not permit fans to visit his tomb. A private security guard is there along with a security camera at all times.

Legacy

Chespirito has been described as one of the most recognized Mexican comedians of the 20th century as well as being well known and honored in all of Latin America. He has been honored for his creative writing, characters, comedic pick-up lines, and for his clean humor style. His TV shows have been made into cartoons since 2006 (El Chavo Animado, with some other Chespirito characters appearing in the show). The animated El Chavo show has been translated into English, Portuguese, and French. An animated TV show based on another famous Chespirito character, El Chapulín Colorado, was announced in 2015. It aired the first episode online on 13 April.

Tributes 
In 2000, Televisa gave him a tribute entitled "They didn't count on my cunning," commemorating the thirty-year anniversary of the humorous program El Chavo del 8. In 2004 the Art Chroniclers Association (ACROARTE) of the Dominican Republic and the Dominican National Brewery awarded him the International Sovereign in recognition of his career in television Latin American and his many facets as a writer, screenwriter, actor, comedian and producer. In 2012 there was a tribute called América celebrates Chespirito made by the same Televisa, the popular singer Thalía performed a song written by Gian Marco Zignago. The Google Doodle of 21 February 2020, honored Chespirito.

Controversies

Accusations of support for dictatorships 
According to El Financiero, Roberto Gómez Bolaños was severely criticized for traveling to nations that were under the yoke of dictators such as Jorge Rafael Videla, in Argentina, and Augusto Pinochet, in Chile. According to the comedian, the cast visited all the countries of the continent, with the exception of Cuba. "The case most criticized by the Mexican media was, perhaps; that of 1978, when Chespirito traveled to Santiago, the Chilean capital, during Pinochet's regime," appearing at the Chilean National Stadium, where he had a record audience of 80,000. On the other hand, at the Quinta Vergara stage during the Viña del Mar Festival, "thousands of fans also attended, who even had to be accommodated in the surrounding mountainous areas, as the place had exceeded its quota."

Gómez Bolaños received negative criticism from the Mexican press, for having appeared at the National Stadium, a place that had been used as a concentration camp. Roberto Gómez did not respond to these accusations until 2005 in the book Sin querer queriendo, he clarified that "none of the actors was aware that the stadium had been a concentration camp" and that, had they known it, "we would have worked there anyway". He goes on to say that, according to that logic, "no actor should present themselves in the Zócalo, where the memory of all those who were murdered during the Ten Tragic Days was muddied". The comedian also expressed his happiness for having performed at the National Stadium: "How can we forget the long standing ovation that they gave us while we did an olympic lap twice, even at the cost of ending up puffing with exhaustion. But it was worth it! Right?."

Judicial conflict with Maria Antonieta De Las Nieves 

In July 2013, Maria Antonieta announced that she finally won the legal fight she had with Chespirito, backed by Televisa, which began in 2001 for the misuse of the character Chilindrina. "You have the scoop of knowing that I have already won the lawsuit against Televisa and Chespirito. Chilindrina is already mine and no one can take her away from me," De Las Nieves said at a press conference in Lima, the capital of Peru. According to the American Mexican media Univision, on 26 July 2013, Gomez Bolaños told them that "the day El Chavo ended, everyone did whatever they wanted with their character, that's how I wanted to do it. I said I was going to continue, he said yes, but later he regretted it and said no." Unlike Carlos Villagran, who left the show in 1978, Maria Antonieta stayed on the show until the late 1990s.

Ending of his series 
On 31 July 2020, all TV channels and streaming services that broadcast any of Chespirito's series made announced that they were no longer broadcasting it from the next day on. Currently, the reason they gave was because the contract expired that day, and Televisa (owner of the series) didn't update it due to revenue disputes with Grupo Chespirito (owner of all episode scripts and almost all characters).

Currently, the only exception to this rule is El Chavo: The Animated Series broadcasting in Brazil, being still broadcast on SBT via the  block and still available locally on Amazon Prime Video.

Awards and nominations 
TVyNovelas Awards

ACE Awards

 On 20 November 2013, Chespirito received the Ondas Iberoamericano Award for the most outstanding career on television.

Filmography

TV series

Films

Director

Producer

Discography 
 1977: Chespirito y Sus Canciones - ¡No Contaban Con Mi Astucia! (Discos Fontana)
 1977: Así Cantamos y Vacilamos en la Vecindad del Chavo (Discos Fontana)
 1979: 1er Festival de la Canción Infantil de Radio Variedades - Canta Chespirito y su Compañía
 1980: El Chavo Canta - ¡Eso, Eso, Eso...! (Discos Fontana)
 1981: Síganme los Buenos a la Vecindad del Chavo (Discos Fontana)
 1989: Chaves (Polydor Records Brazil/SBT)

Books 
 1995: El diario del Chavo del 8
 2003: ...y también poemas
 2006: Sin querer queriendo

See also 
 Cantinflas

References

Bibliography

External links

 
1929 births
2014 deaths
Chespirito actors
Mexican male film actors
Mexican male comedians
Mexican male composers
Mexican parodists
Mexican people of Spanish descent
Mexican songwriters
Male songwriters
Mexican television directors
Mexican male television actors
National Autonomous University of Mexico alumni
Comedians from Mexico City
Male actors from Mexico City
Musicians from Mexico City
People with Parkinson's disease
Comedy franchises